Prestatyn Sports Football Club is a Welsh football team based in Prestatyn, Denbighshire, Wales.  The team currently play in the North Wales Coast East Football League Premier Division, which is at the fourth tier of the Welsh football league system.

History
The club was founded in 2013 by six former members of Prestatyn Rovers. A pitch in the town called 'The Meadows' was leased. The club finished runners-up in Vale of Clwyd and Conwy Football League Division One in their first season, gaining promotion to the Premier Division. The 2014–15 season saw the team achieve great success winning the Premier Division and the Division One title (the latter via the club's reserves team) as well success in multiple cup competitions.

At the end of the 2017–19 season the club were crowned as Welsh Alliance League Division Two champions.  At the end of the 2019–20 season which was curtailed due to the COVID-19 pandemic., the club finished bottom of the table on a points per game basis and were relegated from tier 3, joining the newly formed  North Wales Coast East Football League Premier Division.

In May 2020 the club announced it would move away from its long-term home at Gronant as the facility has failed to meet Tier 3 grading criteria.  The club subsequently moved to The Meadows, and received funding help from the local council to improve the drainage in 2021.

Honours

Welsh Alliance League Division Two – Champions: 2017–18
Vale of Clwyd and Conwy Football League Premier Division – Champions: 2014–15
Vale of Clwyd and Conwy Football League Division One – Champions: 2014–15 (reserves)
Vale of Clwyd and Conwy Football League Division One – Runners-Up: 2013–14
Lock Stock Challenge Cup – Champions: 2016–17
Lock Stock Challenge Cup – Runners-Up: 2015–16
Premier Division Cup – Champions: 2014–15
North Wales Coast FA Intermediate Cup – Champions: 2014–15
Presidents Cup – Champions: 2014–15
R.E.M Jones Cup –Runners-Up: 2013-14

External links
Club website
Club official Twitter
Club official Facebook

References

Sport in Denbighshire
Prestatyn
Football clubs in Wales
North Wales Coast Football League clubs
Welsh Alliance League clubs
Association football clubs established in 2013
2013 establishments in Wales
Vale of Clwyd and Conwy Football League clubs